Aydıntepe is a small town in Bayburt Province in the Black Sea region of Turkey. It is the seat of Aydıntepe District. Its population is 3,239 (2021). The mayor is Haşim Şentürk (MHP).

References

Populated places in Bayburt Province
Towns in Turkey
Aydıntepe District